Austria is a European Parliament constituency for elections in the European Union covering the member state of Austria. It is currently represented by eighteen Members of the European Parliament.

Current Members of the European Parliament

Elections

1996

The 1996 election was the first European election for Austria.

1999

The 1999 European election was the fifth election to the European Parliament and the second for Austria.

2004

The 2004 European election was the sixth election to the European Parliament and the third for Austria.

2009

The 2009 European election was the seventh election to the European Parliament and the fourth for Austria.

2014

The 2014 European election was the eighth election to the European Parliament and the fifth for Austria.

2019

The 2019 European election was the ninth election to the European Parliament and the sixth for Austria.

References

External links
 European Election News by European Election Law Association (Eurela)
 List of MEPs europarl.europa.eu

European Parliament elections in Austria
European Parliament constituencies
1996 establishments in Austria
Constituencies established in 1996